Mari Silverster Andriessen (4 December 1897 – 7 December 1979) was a Dutch sculptor, best known for his work memorializing victims of the Holocaust. Born and died in Haarlem, Andriessen is buried at the RK Begraafplaats Sint Adelberts in Bloemendaal, the Netherlands.

Sculptures
 Cornelis Lely
 Anne Frank, Amsterdam
 Dokwerker, Amsterdam
 Vrijheidsbeeld (means Freedom statue), Vrijheidsdreef, Groenendaal park, Heemstede

External links

 
 Mari Andriessen artworks (paintings, watercolours, drawings), biography, information and signatures

1897 births
1979 deaths
Artists from Haarlem
Articles containing video clips
20th-century Dutch sculptors